The Met Office Hadley Centre — named in honour of George Hadley —  is one of the United Kingdom's leading centres for the study of scientific issues associated with climate change.  It is part of, and based at the headquarters of the Met Office in Exeter.

Foundation 

The Hadley Centre  was founded in 1990, having been approved by the then British Prime Minister Margaret Thatcher and was first named the Hadley Centre for Climate Research and Prediction but subsequently renamed on various occasions.

Major aims 

The centre has several major aims:

To understand physical, chemical and biological processes within the climate system and develop state-of-the-art climate models
To use climate models to simulate global and regional climate variability and change
To predict inter-annual to decadal variability of climate 
To predict long term climate change
To monitor global and national climate variability and change
To attribute recent changes in climate to specific factors

The 30th anniversary of the Hadley Centre was celebrated in 2020.

The Met Office employs over 1500 staff, with approximately 200 working in its climate research unit. Most of its funding comes from contracts with the Department for Environment, Food and Rural Affairs (DEFRA), other United Kingdom Government departments and the European Commission. It also works closely with the Intergovernmental Panel on Climate Change (IPCC) providing worldwide climate forecasting and predictions.

The climate model (HadGEM) developed by the centre is used for climate change research purposes across the world. It covers both Ocean modelling and Atmospheric Modelling. Collecting data from across the world.

Research projects based on Hadley Centre climate models

The UK Climate Prediction Project uses the Hadley Centre climate model projections of future UK climate to inform UK government policy.

The Australian Bureau of Meteorology and the Korean Meteorological Agency use the Hadley Centre GloSea5 system for long range prediction.

The volunteer computing project ClimatePrediction.net is a research team based at the University of Oxford conducting research into global climate change using adapted versions of the climate models developed at the Hadley Centre. Individuals can participate in the research efforts by donating spare computer resources to aid their research.

The PRECIS (Providing Regional Climates for Impacts Studies) project  enables scientists from the around the globe to run a regional climate model towards carrying out research into climate change.

References

External links
 
 Hadley Centre data provision

Climate change organisations based in the United Kingdom
Numerical climate and weather models
Research in the United Kingdom
1990 establishments in the United Kingdom
Met Office